Maxi may refer to:

People

Given name 
 Maxi Biancucchi (born 1984), Argentine footballer who plays for Flamengo
 Maxi López (born 1984), Argentine footballer who plays in Europe
 Maxi Pereira, Uruguayan footballer who plays for SL Benfica
 Maxi Rodríguez (born 1981), Argentine footballer who plays for Newell's Old Boys
 Maximiliano Vallejo (born 1982), Argentine footballer who plays for Shahrdari Bandar Abbas FC
 Maxi Kleber (born 1992), German basketball player

Stage name or nickname 
 Maxi (singer) (born 1950), Irish radio disc-jockey and producer; actor, journalist, and singer
 Maxi Glamour, American drag artist
 Maxi Jazz (1957-2022), English musician, rapper, singer-songwriter and DJ; lead vocalist of Faithless
 Maxi Priest (born 1961), British reggae vocalist of Jamaican descent
 Maxi, a contestant on the series Blush: The Search for the Next Great Makeup Artist
 Glenn Maxwell, Australian cricketer known as "Maxi"

Fictional characters 
 Maxi (Soulcalibur), a Ryukyuan pirate from the Soul series of fighting games
 Father Maxi, a priest from the comedy series South Park
 Maxi Purvis, from the ITV drama series, Bad Girls
 Maxi, from TV series Roary the Racing Car

Retail stores 
 Maxi (Canadian supermarket) and Maxi & Co., a groceries store in Quebec, Canada
 Maxi (Serbian supermarket), a Serbian supermarket chain
 ICA Maxi, and MAXI ICA Stormarknad, stores operated by Swedish retailer ICA AB

Other uses 
 Maxi (album), by Maxi Priest
 MAXI (ISS Experiment), an X-ray monitoring device aboard the International Space Station
 Austin Maxi, a 1970s medium-sized 5-door hatchback car produced by British Leyland
 Maxi dress, an ankle-length dress
 Maxi language, which is a spoken in Benin (also known as Fon)
 Maxi pad, a type of absorbent sanitary towel worn by women
 Maxi single, a music single release with more than the usual two tracks
 Maxi skirt, an ankle-length skirt
 Maxi yacht, a large racing sailboat